Tim Lawson (born December 13, 1961 in Sterling, Illinois) is an American writer and musician.

Bibliography 
Tim Lawson & Alisa Persons, The Magic Behind The Voices: A Who's Who of Cartoon Voice Actors, University Press of Mississippi 2004, .

Sources 
 University Press of Mississippi: http://www.upress.state.ms.us/books/461 

1961 births
Living people
People from Sterling, Illinois
Musicians from Illinois